"Calling All the Heroes" is the second single by It Bites. It was written by frontman Francis Dunnery, and charted at #6 on the UK charts in August 1986.

Track listing 
7" vinyl:
 "Calling All the Heroes" (7")
 "Strange But True" (7")

12" vinyl:
 "Calling All the Heroes" (Full Length Version)
 "Calling All the Heroes" (7")
 "Strange But True" (Full Length Version)

References

1986 singles
It Bites songs
1986 songs